Steve Lucero (born 29 June 1964) is a former speedway rider from the United States.

Speedway career 
Lucero is a two times North American champion, winning the AMA National Speedway Championship in 1988 and 1996.

He rode in the top tier of British Speedway in 1984, riding for the Eastbourne Eagles and the Wolverhampton Wolves.

References 

1964 births
Living people
American speedway riders
Eastbourne Eagles riders
Wolverhampton Wolves riders